Year 143 (CXLIII) was a common year starting on Monday (link will display the full calendar) of the Julian calendar. At the time, it was known as the Year of the Consulship of Torquatus and Hipparchus (or, less frequently, year 896 Ab urbe condita). The denomination 143 for this year has been used since the early medieval period, when the Anno Domini calendar era became the prevalent method in Europe for naming years.

Events

By place

Roman Empire 
Antoninus Pius serves as Roman Consul.
 A revolt of the Brigantes tribe in Britannia is suppressed by Quintus Lollius Urbicus.

 By topic 

 Medicine 
 The Roman doctor Antyllus performs the first arteriotomy.

Births 
 Athenais, Roman noblewoman (d. 161)
 Chong of Han, Chinese emperor (d. 145)

Deaths 
 Cui Yuan, Chinese politician and poet
 Venera, Roman Christian saint (b. c. 100)

References